The 1999–2000 Vancouver Canucks season was the team's 30th in the National Hockey League (NHL). The Canucks missed the playoffs for the fourth consecutive season.

Off-season

Regular season
December 12, 1999: With a victory over the Vancouver Canucks, Patrick Roy passed Tony Esposito's mark of 423 victories.

Final standings

Schedule and results

Player statistics

Awards and records

Transactions

Trades

Draft picks
Vancouver's picks at the 1999 NHL Entry Draft in Boston, Massachusetts.

Farm teams
Syracuse Crunch (AHL)

See also
1999–2000 NHL season

References
 

Vancouver Canucks seasons
Vancouver C
Vancouver